The Harpeth Hills Flying Monkey Marathon is a  road race in Percy Warner Park, the larger of the Warner Parks in Nashville, Tennessee. It was created to be among the top five most difficult road marathons in the United States, and was designed to be somewhat anti-establishment and grassroots in character. In particular, the Harpeth Hills Flying Monkey Marathon is consciously not part of any running series and is neither certified nor sanctioned by the USATF, but is the standard  . A runner cannot use this race to qualify for the Boston Marathon. This marathon was initially dreamt up by a broad array of Middle Tennessee runners and was first described on an internet message board dedicated to Middle Tennessee runners. The original organizers included Trent Rosenbloom, The Nashville Striders, Peter Pressman, Diana Bibeau, and others.

The marathon was inaugurated on November 19, 2006, with 97 runners. In the inaugural running, the first place male runner finished in 2:50:25, and the first place female finisher in 3:11:05. The marathon's second running took place on November 18, 2007 with 174 runners from 29 states, two Canadian provinces, and one from Italy. In 2007, the overall male winner cut 4:50 off the course record by finishing in 2:45:35. In 2008, four runners broke the previous course record, when Ben Schneider set a new 9:10 minute course record by winning with 2:36:25 on a sunny 30–40 degree day. Ben had successes in 2009, 2010, 2011 and 2012 when he returned to defend his title. In 2012, Olympic Trialist Leah Thorvilson became the first woman to break 3 hours on the course. The race is run in Percy Warner Park in Nashville, Tennessee – one of the country's largest public city parks. It is one of the hardest road marathons in the country according to many runners, and has been named the best marathon in Tennessee. In 2019, the race inaugurated the first HALF Monkey distance.

The marathon starting and finishing line is located at 7601 Highway 100 South, Nashville, TN, 37221.
Coordinates:  (36.066255, −86.900418).

Origin
The marathon's creator asserts that the marathon's name honors a local legend about flying monkeys. According to the legend, the flying monkeys are an endangered cryptid often confused with large owls and hawks. Before 1939, the monkeys were supposedly commonly seen throughout the Southeastern United States, with large populations living in middle Tennessee and Appalachia. The legend states that, following 1939, the flying monkeys were hunted to the point of near-extinction.

Race history

Results history

The Warner Parks

The Warner Parks, one of eighty parks owned and operated by the Nashville Metropolitan Board of Parks and Recreation, are located in southwest Davidson County in the Harpeth Hills. The Parks comprise a vast rolling woodland in the heart of the Nashville community, and are situated just  from downtown. The Warner Parks together make up one of the largest city parks in the country. While the parks have walking and nature trails, the singular draw for runners is their extensive network of paved running routes.

Snaking through the  Percy Warner Park is the  Main Drive. The route goes by scenic overlooks of Nashville, various sports and recreation areas, and quiet picnic pavilions. Runners also pass the grounds of the Iroquois Steeplechase, one of the country's oldest grassy horse tracks.

References

External links
Marathon's website
Elly Foster's Pictures from the 2010 Marathon
Troy Gizzi's Pictures from the 2010 Marathon
Houston Masters Sports Association Newsletter with review
Flying Monkey Marathon Chatter
Rules for the Flying Monkey Marathon
Marathon and Beyond Magazine Partner
Vulcan Runner story on the marathon

Marathons in the United States
Sports in Nashville, Tennessee
Recurring sporting events established in 2006
Sports competitions in Tennessee
2006 establishments in Tennessee